Jubek State was a state in South Sudan that existed between 2 October 2015 and 22 February 2020. It contained the national capital, Juba, which is also the largest city in South Sudan. The state bordered include Yei River county to the southwest, Amadi county to the west, Terekeka county to the north, and Imatong county to the east.

History
On 2 October 2015, the president of South Sudan issued a decree establishing 28 states in order to replace the 10 constitutionally established states. The decree established the new states mostly among ethnic lines. A number of opposition parties and civil society groups challenged the constitutionality of the decree, and these actions led to president Salva Kiir to take the decree to parliament for approval as a constitutional amendment. In November the South Sudanese parliament empowered President Kiir to create new states.

As part of that reorganization, the former Juba County was turned into a separate state and renamed "Jubek". Augustino Jadalla Wani was appointed as the governor of Jubek State on 24 December 2015.

Administrative divisions
As part of the 2016 reorganization, Jubek State was divided into fourteen counties, that were fully implemented on 16 September 2016. They are Lodu, Luri, Mongalla, Gondokoro, Rejaf, Wonduruba, Lobonok, Bungu, Ganji (Ganzi), Dollo,  Rokon, Lyria and Oponi.

Each county also got its own commissioner.

Geography

Rivers
The state is crossed from south to north by the White Nile, which is called locally Bahr el-Jebel ("Mountain River" in Arabic) or Sukiri. The capital Juba is located on its west bank. The state contains several tributaries of the White Nile, including the Koda, Kaia, Ayi, Loiforo (Lefureur), Kit, Luri, Nvigera, Lori, and Gwar.

Towns and cities
Juba is the capital of Jubek state, as it was of the former Juba County.  It is also the capital and most populous city of the entre country of South Sudan.

The following is a partial list of the towns and cities in Jubek (and formerly in Juba County):

County capitals
Lodu
Luri
Mongalla  
Dollo  
Gondokoro  
Rejaf  
Wonduruba
Lobonok
Bungu
Ganji (Ganzi)
Rokon  
Lyria
Oponi

Other towns and villages
Buko  
Guruloguthu  
Jalang   
Jigokwe  
Kimangoro  
Lado Koda   
Lado   
Logogvi or Logogwi      
Luala   
Ludo Kenyi    
Mussikidolk  
Murgan  
Nija   
Rija  
Rombe Lako   
Tijor  
Wulikare

Peaks

This is a partial list of hills and mountains in Jubek State:
Jebel Dolo  
Jebeli Germok  
Jebel Kamarok  
Jebel Kunufi  
Jebel Lado  
Jebel Malakwa  
Jebel Malakea  
Jebel Merikia  
Jebel Miri, or Miri Hills,  
Jebel Rija

References

External links
Jubek State Governor's Office

Equatoria
States of South Sudan